The 1960 WCHA Men's Ice Hockey Tournament was the 1st conference playoff in league history. Additionally it is the first conference tournament ever held for an American college ice hockey conference. The tournament was played between March 11 and March 12, 1960. All games were played at home team campus sites. By being declared as co-champions, both Michigan Tech and Denver were invited to participate in the 1960 NCAA Men's Ice Hockey Tournament.

Though not official designations, Michigan Tech is considered as the East Regional Champion† and Denver as the West Regional Champion‡.

Format
The top four teams in the WCHA, based upon the conference regular season standings, were eligible for the tournament and were seeded No. 1 through No. 4. In the first round the first and fourth seeds and the second and third seeds were matched in two-game series where the team with the higher number of goals scored was declared the winner. Rather than decide upon a single tournament champion, the WCHA declared the winners of the two series as co-tournament champions.

Conference standings
Note: GP = Games played; W = Wins; L = Losses; T = Ties; PCT = Winning percentage; GF = Goals for; GA = Goals against

Bracket

Note: * denotes overtime period(s)

Finals

(1) Denver vs. (4) Colorado College

(2) Michigan Tech vs. (3) North Dakota

Tournament awards
None

See also
Western Collegiate Hockey Association men's champions
1960 NCAA Men's Ice Hockey Tournament

References

External links
WCHA.com
1959–60 WCHA Standings
1959–60 NCAA Standings
2013–14 Colorado College Tigers Media Guide
2013–14 Denver Pioneers Media Guide
2013–14 North Dakota Hockey Media Guide

WCHA Men's Ice Hockey Tournament
Wcha Men's Ice Hockey Tournament